Kajtazi Brothers Educational Institute (formally Kajtazi Brothers Educational Institute Tirana, or VKT) is a non-public school in Albania.

It was established in 2001 with the licensing of the Ministry of Education and Sciences on the outskirts of the city of Tirana, Vaqarr and then in 2002 opened its branch in the city of Durrës. In 2001 the Institute of Education Kajtazi Brothers developed basic 8-year-old education and secondary education for 4-year-olds.   In September 2011 VKT branch in Durrës closed.

Notable alumni
 Almeda Abazi - Miss Tirana 2007, Miss Shqipëria 2008, Prezë Castle Venue and Miss Globe International 2008 
 Albi Dosti - professional footballer of KS Teuta and Albania U-21

References

 Ministry of Education and Sciences (Albania)  in Albanian

Buildings and structures in Tirana
Secondary schools in Albania
2001 establishments in Albania
Educational institutions established in 2001
Elementary and primary schools in Albania
Schools in Tirana